On April 10, 2022, Rōki Sasaki of the Chiba Lotte Marines of Nippon Professional Baseball's (NPB) Pacific League threw a perfect game against the Orix Buffaloes at Zozo Marine Stadium in Chiba City. It was the 16th perfect game in NPB history. Sasaki tied a NPB single-game record with 19 strikeouts and set an NPB record with 13 consecutive strikeouts.

Background
The Chiba Lotte Marines of Nippon Professional Baseball (NPB) selected Sasaki with the first overall pick in the 2019 NPB draft. Lotte had him train in bullpen sessions exclusively during the 2020 season to prevent injury. He made his NPB debut in 2021.

Game synopsis
The Marines played a home game against the Orix Buffaloes at Zozo Marine Stadium on April 10, 2022. Sasaki started for Lotte while Hiroya Miyagi, the Pacific League Rookie of the Year for 2021, started for Orix. The first two batters Sasaki faced grounded out. He completed the top of the first inning by recording a strikeout of Masataka Yoshida, who led the Pacific League in batting during the 2021 season. Lotte scored a run off of Miyagi in the bottom of the first inning with two singles followed by a run batted in (RBI) groundout.

Sasaki then continued to strike out batters, striking out all three batters faced in the second, third, and fourth innings, setting a new NPB record with his tenth consecutive strikeout, also of Yoshida, in the fourth inning. The previous record had been set by Takao Kajimoto of the Hankyu Braves in 1957 and tied by Masayuki Dobashi of the Toei Flyers in 1958. Sasaki struck out the side in the top of the fifth inning, reaching 13 consecutive strikeouts. This also became a new world record, surpassing the 10 consecutive strikeouts achieved in Major League Baseball (MLB) by Corbin Burnes, Tom Seaver, and Aaron Nola. In the bottom of the sixth inning, Lotte scored five runs when Shogo Nakamura was hit by a pitch, followed by an RBI double by Brandon Laird, an RBI single by Adeiny Hechavarria, and a three RBI double by Kō Matsukawa, Lotte's 18-year-old catcher.

Sasaki finished the game with a strikeout of pinch hitter Yutaro Sugimoto, who led the Pacific League in home runs in 2021. Sugimoto's strikeout was the final out of the game and Sasaki's 19th strikeout, tying the NPB record set by Koji Noda of the Orix BlueWave in 1995. Sasaki completed the game with 105 pitches thrown. It was the first perfect game in NPB since November 1, 2007 (Game 6 of the 2007 Japan Series, a combined perfect game not recognised by NPB but is recognised globally as a no-hitter), as well as the 97th no-hitter in NPB and its predecessors , the first since August 15, 2020. Yoshida struck out three times against Sasaki, despite striking out just 26 times during the 2021 season, the lowest for all hitters.

At the age of 20 years and five months, Sasaki became the youngest NPB pitcher to throw a perfect game. Sasaki compiled a game score of 106, surpassing the 105 for Kerry Wood's 20 strikeout game from the 1998 Major League Baseball season, which was the highest MLB game score since the end of the baseball color line.

As a result of this game, the Marines improved to 7-6 and the Buffaloes fell to 6-9 on the season.

Line score

Box score

Aftermath
In his next start, on April 17, Sasaki pitched eight perfect innings against the Hokkaido Nippon-Ham Fighters, before manager Tadahito Iguchi took him out of the game before the ninth inning. He recorded 14 strikeouts on 102 pitches, including striking out the side in the eighth inning with a 101-mph fastball. Sasaki finished the game having retired 52 consecutive batters, setting an NPB record. The MLB record for retiring consecutive batters is 46 by Yusmeiro Petit. Sasaki's streak ended in his next game, on April 24, after he allowed a hit on the first pitch that he threw.

A ball from the game autographed by Sasaki was donated to the National Baseball Hall of Fame and Museum in Cooperstown, New York.

The Orix Buffaloes would go on to win their first Japan Series title since  (as the Orix BlueWave), while Sasaki's Marines would miss the playoffs for the first time since .

Notes

References

2022 Nippon Professional Baseball season
Nippon Professional Baseball perfect games
Chiba Lotte Marines
April 2022 sports events in Asia
Orix Buffaloes
Sport in Chiba (city)
Sports competitions in Chiba Prefecture
History of Chiba Prefecture